Phillip Eugene Taylor Sr. (born April 7, 1988) is a former American football nose tackle. He was drafted in the first round of the 2011 NFL Draft by the Cleveland Browns. He played college football at Penn State and Baylor.

High school career
A native of Clinton, Maryland, Taylor attended Gwynn Park High School, where he was a two-way lineman for head coach Dan Hayes. In his junior year, he was credited with 30 pancake blocks along offensive line. As a senior, he registered 77 tackles with 10 sacks, earning first-team all-state and Washington Post first-team all-metro honors.

Regarded as a four-star recruit by Rivals.com, Taylor was ranked as the No. 11 defensive tackle in the nation, in a class highlighted by Gerald McCoy and Al Woods. Taylor took official visits to Maryland and Penn State only, despite also holding offers by Florida, Ohio State, and Virginia Tech, among others. In January 2006, Taylor committed to Penn State.

College career
After sitting out the first half of his true freshman year at Penn State, Taylor made his collegiate debut against Michigan and went on to play the season's final seven games for the Nittany Lions. In his sophomore year, he sustained a knee injury during preseason drills but still managed to play 12 games on the season, starting the Nittany Lions' final five games. He was credited with 20 tackles, 12 solo efforts, with 6.5 tackles for loss resulting in loss of 26 yards. He also tallied 3.0 sacks, good for loss of 18 yards, and recovered two fumbles. His finale game for Penn State came at the Alamo Bowl against Texas A&M with five-tackle performance that included one tackle for loss.

In October 2007, Taylor was among several Nittany Lions involved in a brawl during a fraternity party at HUB–Robeson Center. He pleaded guilty to a disorderly conduct misdemeanor, and was put on probation by Joe Paterno. In the summer of 2008, Taylor and Chris Baker were involved in a minor pool party fracas, which resulted in both being ejected from the team. Taylor eventually transferred to Baylor in September 2008 and sat out the season in compliance with NCAA Division I transfer policy.

As a junior in 2009, Taylor earned his first Baylor letter, playing all 12 games and started nine. For the season, he totaled 25 tackles (2.5 for loss), an assisted sack, five QB hurries, two blocked kicks and one interception, despite battling a “turf toe” injury through the middle portion of the season. In May 2010, Taylor spent two weeks in Nairobi on a sports mission trip to Kenya with other Baylor athletes. He entered his senior year having shed almost 30 pounds, and started all 13 games at nose guard. He totaled 62 tackles (35 solo)—the most by a Baylor interior lineman since Ethan Kelley in 2002—, seven for loss including two sacks, three QB hurries, two pass breakups and one forced fumble. In his final college career game, the Texas Bowl against Illinois, Taylor had a career-high 10 tackles.

Professional career

For his physical abilities, Taylor was projected a safe first-round selection in the 2011 NFL Draft. He was drafted 21st overall by the Cleveland Browns. Taylor was the highest-selected Baylor defensive tackle since Daryl Gardener in 1996.

Cleveland Browns
After a four-day holdout, Taylor signed a four-year contract worth $8.1 million. During his rookie season, Taylor started every game and finished the season with 59 tackles, 4 sacks, and a forced fumble. Taylor was a major standout in his rookie season, outperforming higher picks of the same position such as Nick Fairley and Corey Liuget.

In 2011, Taylor enjoyed his best season where he had 59 tackles and four sacks.

Taylor was also selected to the Pro Football Weekly All-Rookie team of 2011, with teammate Jabaal Sheard.

On September 1, 2015, the Browns released Taylor.

Taylor started 42 games for the Cleveland Browns, posting seven sacks and 69 tackles.

Denver Broncos
On February 22, 2016, Taylor signed with the Denver Broncos. On July 31, 2016 Taylor was placed on Injured reserve due to a knee injury suffered in training camp. He was released on August 10, 2016.

Washington Redskins
On January 6, 2017, Taylor signed a one-year contract with the Washington Redskins. In the Redskins' third preseason game, Taylor suffered a torn quad that would keep him out for the entire 2017 season. He was officially place on injured reserve on September 2, 2017.

On April 3, 2018, Taylor re-signed with the Redskins. He was released prior to the 2018 regular season on September 1.

On March 13, 2019, Taylor announced his retirement from the NFL.

NFL statistics

References

External links

Baylor Bears bio
Cleveland Browns bio
Washington Redskins bio

1988 births
Living people
American football defensive tackles
Penn State Nittany Lions football players
Baylor Bears football players
Cleveland Browns players
Players of American football from Maryland
People from Clinton, Maryland
Denver Broncos players
Washington Redskins players